The National Council of Intra-Indian Relations is an autonomous inter-provincial body that handles skirmishes and other issues that arise between the various ethnic and religious groups that comprise the diverse Indian population. Established in 1948 soon after independence from Great Britain, the Council was crucial to the stabilization of the political climate in the country during the formative years of the democracy.

See also
Ethnic relations in India
Politics of India

References

Government agencies of India